Der Luftpirat und sein lenkbares Luftschiff (The Air Pirate and His Steerable Airship) was a German pulp magazine with 165 issues from 1908–1911. The book followed the adventures of Captain Mors, the "Air Pirate".

The series was banned in 1916 together with nearly 150 other series under the military censorship apparatus. In the case of the "Luftpirat" and some other series, the production plates were destroyed so the series couldn't be reprinted after the end of the First World War.

A print on demand edition was published in 2005, edited by Heinz J. Galle, containing issues 1, 40, 42, 56, 63, and 66. In the preface, Heinz J. Galle attributes the work to Oskar Hoffmann, however this contradicts Lexikon der deutschen Science Fiction & Fantasy by Klaus Geus.

A reprint of all available issues is currently being undertaken by German print-on-demand publisher Villa-Galactica.

List of titles

Literature

Adaptations

League of Extraordinary Gentlemen
Captain Mors, labelled a "notorious air-pirate" is referenced in Allan Moore's comic The League of Extraordinary Gentlemen Volume 1.

References

External links 
 The Captain Mors Page

German science fiction novels
Science fiction book series
Air pirates
Space pirates